Iphiclus is a genus of beetles in the family Erotylidae. It was first described by Louis Alexandre Auguste Chevrolat in 1836.

References 

Cucujoidea genera
Erotylidae